The 1972 All-Big Ten Conference football team consists of American football players chosen by various organizations for All-Big Ten Conference teams for the 1972 Big Ten Conference football season.  The teams selected by the Big Ten coaches for the United Press International (UPI) were led by Michigan with seven first-team selections, Michigan State with five first-team selections, and Ohio State with four first-team selections.

Offensive selections

Quarterbacks

 Mike Wells, Illinois (AP-1; UPI-1)
 Dennis Franklin, Michigan (AP-2; UPI-2)

Backs
 Otis Armstrong, Purdue (AP-1; UPI-1)
 Rufus Ferguson, Wisconsin (AP-1; UPI-2)
 John King, Minnesota (AP-1; UPI-2)
 Ed Shuttlesworth, Michigan (UPI-1)
 Harold Henson, Ohio State (AP-2; UPI-2)
 Greg Boykin, Northwestern (AP-2)
 Ken Starling, Indiana (AP-2)

Flankers

 Glenn Scolnik, Indiana (AP-1 [end]; UPI-1)

Split ends
 Jim Lash, Northwestern (UPI-1)
 Garvin Roberson, Illinois (AP-2 [end]; UPI-2)

Tight ends
 Steve Craig, Northwestern (AP-1 [end]; UPI-1)
 Billy Joe DuPree, Michigan State (AP-2 [end]; UPI-1)

Tackles
 Paul Seymour, Michigan (AP-1; UPI-1)
 John Hicks, Ohio State (AP-1; UPI-1)
 Bill Geiger, Indiana (AP-2)
 John Muller, Iowa (AP-2)
 Jim Coode, Michigan (UPI-2)
 James Nicholson, Michigan State (UPI-2)

Guards
 Joe DeLamielleure, Michigan State (AP-1; UPI-1)
 Tom Coyle, Michigan (AP-1; UPI-1)
 Charles Bonica, Ohio State (AP-2; UPI-1)
 Keith Nosbusch, Wisconsin (AP-2; UPI-2)

Centers
 Larry McCarren, Illinois (AP-1; UPI-1)
 Bill Hart, Michigan (AP-2)
 Mike Webster, Wisconsin (UPI-2)

Defensive selections

Linemen

 Steve Baumgartner, Purdue (AP-1 [front four]; UPI-1 [end])
 Dave Butz, Purdue (AP-1 [front four]; UPI-1 [tackle])
 Fred Grambau, Michigan (AP-1 [front four]; UPI-1 [tackle])
 George Hasenohrl, Ohio State (AP-1 [front four]; UPI-1 [tackle])
 Clint Spearman, Michigan (UPI-1 [end])
 Gary Van Elst, Michigan State (AP-2 [front four]; UPI-2 [tackle])
 Larry Allen, Illinois (UPI-2 [end])
 Jim Anderson, Northwestern (AP-2 [front four])
 Tab Bennett, Illinois (AP-2 [front four])
 Brian McConnell, Michigan State (UPI-2 [end])

Linebackers
 Greg Bingham, Purdue (AP-1 [middle guard]; UPI-1)
 Gail Clark, Michigan State (AP-1; UPI-1)
 Randy Gradishar, Ohio State (AP-1; UPI-1)
 Dave Lokanc, Wisconsin (AP-1; UPI-2)
 Mike Fulk, Indiana (AP-2; UPI-2)
 Tom Kee, Michigan (AP-2; UPI-2)
 Andre Jackson, Iowa (AP-2)

Defensive backs

 Randy Logan, Michigan (AP-1; UPI-1)
 Bill Simpson, Michigan State (AP-1; UPI-1)
 Brad Van Pelt, Michigan State (AP-1; UPI-1)
 Dave Brown, Michigan (AP-2; UPI-1)
 Rick Penney, Iowa (AP-2)
 Tim Alderson, Minnesota (UPI-2)
 Earl Houthitt, Iowa (UPI-2)
 Richard Seifert, Ohio State (UPI-2)
 Greg Strunk, Northwestern (AP-2; UPI-2)

Key
AP = Associated Press, selected by the AP's Midwest Football Board

UPI = United Press International, selected by the Big Ten Conference coaches

Bold = Consensus first-team selection of AP and UPI

See also
1972 College Football All-America Team

References

All-Big Ten Conference
All-Big Ten Conference football teams